
Year 413 BC was a year of the pre-Julian Roman calendar. At the time, it was known as the Year of the Consulship of Cossus and Medullinus (or, less frequently, year 341 Ab urbe condita). The denomination 413 BC for this year has been used since the early medieval period, when the Anno Domini calendar era became the prevalent method in Europe for naming years.

Events 
 By place 

 Greece 
 After suffering a defeat in which the Athenian commander Lamachus is killed, Demosthenes suggests that they immediately give up the siege of Syracuse and return to Athens, where they are needed to defend against a Spartan invasion of Attica. Nicias refuses, but the Syracusans and Spartans under Hermocrates are able to trap the Athenians in the harbour and the Athenians sustain heavy losses in the Battle of Syracuse. Demosthenes is ambushed by the Syracusans and is forced to surrender. Nicias is soon captured as well, and both are executed, with most of the surviving Athenian soldiers sent to work in the Sicilian quarries. Ten proboulos (including Sophocles) are elected to help run Athens.
 Tissaphernes, the Persian satrap of Lydia and Caria, forms an alliance with Sparta. The Spartans, with strategic advice from Alcibiades and limited assistance from the Persians under Pharnabazus, advance almost to the gates of Athens. King Agis II leads the Spartan force that occupies Decelea in Attica.
 Archelaus I becomes King of Macedonia following the death of his father, King Perdiccas II. Archelaus seizes the throne after murdering his uncle, his cousin, and his half brother, the legitimate heir.

 By topic 

 Drama 
 Euripides' play Electra is performed.

Births

Deaths 
 Demosthenes, Athenian general
 Nicias, Athenian soldier and statesman (b. 470 BC)
 Perdiccas II, Macedonian king

References